Live Free or Die is the state motto of the U.S. state of New Hampshire. 

Live Free or Die may also refer to the following:

Film
Live Free or Die (2000 film), a 2000 documentary about abortion
Live Free or Die (2006 film), a 2006 comedy movie
Live Free or Die Hard, a 2007 action movie, the fourth in the Die Hard series

Television
"Live Free or Die" (Breaking Bad), an episode from the fifth season of Breaking Bad
"Live Free or Die" (The Sopranos), an episode from the sixth season of The Sopranos
Live Free or Die, a 2014 National Geographic Channel reality television series about people who live off the grid.

Literature
Live Free or Die (1993 novel), a 1990 and 1993 novel by New Hampshire writer Ernest Hebert
Live Free or Die (2010 novel), a 2010 novel by science fiction writer John Ringo